Britta Kamrau-Corestein (born 6 April 1979 in Rostock) is a German long-distance swimmer. She is a former European champion at the 5 km, 10 km and 25 km open water distances and former world champion at the 25 km.

In March 2007 she was the center of some controversy after she claimed that Australian swimmer Kate Brookes-Peterson pulled her from behind in the final 100 meters of the 5 km open water race at the 2007 World Aquatics Championships denying her a bronze medal.

See also
 World Open Water Championships - Multiple medalists

References

External links
Official Website

1979 births
German female swimmers
German female long-distance swimmers
Sportspeople from Rostock
Living people
World Aquatics Championships medalists in open water swimming